The Vilva is a river in Perm Krai, Russia, a left tributary of the Usva. It starts on the west foothills of the Ural, near the border with Sverdlovsk Oblast. It flows west and southwest, entering the Usva  from the larger river's mouth near the town of Chusovoy.

Main tributaries 
Left: Vizhay
Right:  North Rassokha, Bolshaya Myasnaya, Korostelevka, Bolshaya Porozhnaya, Tanchikha.

Etymology 

The river name is a composite of the Komi-Permyak words vil (new) and va (water).

References

External links 
Vilva in encyclopedia of Perm Krai

Rivers of Perm Krai